Berardinetti is an Italian surname. Notable people with the surname include:

Lorenzo Berardinetti (born 1961), Canadian politician
Michelle Holland (née Berardinetti, born 1973), Canadian politician

Italian-language surnames